Symphlebia underwoodi is a moth in the subfamily Arctiinae. It was described by Rothschild in 1910. It is found in Costa Rica and Honduras.

References

Moths described in 1910
underwoodi